In mathematics, the Zarhin trick is a method for eliminating the polarization of  abelian varieties A by observing that the abelian variety A4 × Â4 is principally polarized.

References

Abelian varieties